Utopia is the first solo novel by Lincoln Child published in 2002. It is set in a futuristic amusement park called Utopia, a park that relies heavily on holographics and robotics. Dr. Andrew Warne, the man who designed the program that runs the park's robots, is called in to help fix a problem. But when he gets there, he finds out that the park is being held hostage by a mysterious man known as John Doe.

Worlds
Utopia consists of five "Worlds", each modelled after different time eras.

The Nexus: A neutral setting between the Worlds.
Gaslight: Based on Victorian London.
Camelot: A medieval kingdom.
Boardwalk: A reproduction of a sea side amusement park.
Callisto: A futuristic spaceport above Jupiter's sixth moon.
Atlantis: A water park based on the lost continent of Atlantis (in the novel, Atlantis is still under construction, and is seen in the epilogue).

Rides and attractions
Notting Hill Chase: In Gaslight, this rollercoaster is themed as a runaway midnight carriage ride. In the prologue this ride malfunctions and a boy named Corey is seriously injured.

Professor Cripplewood's Chamber of Fantastic Illusion (HoloMirrors): An advanced fun house that uses mirrors and holograms. John Doe attempts to kidnap Sarah Boatwright in this attraction.

Critical Reception
Reception was generally positive with many reviewers claiming it to be a "page turner¨  and "Child rarely takes the obvious approach"

References

External links
Preston/Child web page with two Utopia sample chapters

2003 American novels
2003 science fiction novels
Techno-thriller novels
Novels by Lincoln Child
Utopian novels
American thriller novels